Stuart Charles Pearson (1934–2015), was a male boxer who competed for England.

Boxing career
He represented England and won a silver medal in the -71 Kg division at the 1958 British Empire and Commonwealth Games in Cardiff, Wales.

Pearson won the 1958 and 1959 Amateur Boxing Association British light-middleweight title, when boxing out of the Doncaster Plant Works ABC.

References

1934 births
2015 deaths
English male boxers
Commonwealth Games medallists in boxing
Commonwealth Games silver medallists for England
Boxers at the 1958 British Empire and Commonwealth Games
Light-middleweight boxers
Medallists at the 1958 British Empire and Commonwealth Games